The Castle Hill Wind Farm is a proposed wind farm being developed by Genesis Energy. It will have up to 286 wind turbines with potential output of up to 858 MW, depending on what model(s) of wind turbines are selected. The project is estimated to cost more than $1.6 billion and will be New Zealand's largest wind farm.

The resource consent application was lodged in August 2011 and consents were granted in June 2012. This was appealed to the Environment Court. In July 2013, Genesis announced that all appeals had been resolved. Resource consent for the project expires in 2023.

Resource consent for the wind farm expires if work is not begun before 2023. In February 2021 Genesis announced that constructing the wind farm remained an option. In August they announced they had no plans to build it. In September 2021, Genesis said that the wind farm was still part of their plans for renewable development, but that other projects had been prioritised ahead of it.

In March 2023 Genesis applied to extend the resource consent for the wind farm and vary its conditions.

See also

Wind power in New Zealand

References

External links 
 

Proposed wind farms in New Zealand
Tararua District